Jason Cullen (born 11 June 1988) is an Irish professional darts player who currently plays in the Professional Darts Corporation events.

Darts career

Cullen has represented the Republic of Ireland in the WDF Europe Cup Youth in 2004 and was runner-up in the Singles. He also played in the WDF World Cupin Perth and in 2012 he was in his national team for the WDF Europe Cup and the Six Nations Cup.

Cullen qualified for the 2013 BDO World Championship. In the first round he played the number 11 seed Martin Atkins and won 3–1, but lost to Paul Jennings in the Second round.

He won the fourth PDC Challenge Tour of 2018, defeating Cameron Menzies in the final. In 2019 he reached the final of the nineteenth PDC Challenge Tour event, losing to Kyle McKinstry.

World Championship Results

BDO

 2013: 2nd Round (lost to Paul Jennings 0-4)

References

External links
 Jason Cullen Profile

1988 births
Living people
Irish darts players
British Darts Organisation players
Professional Darts Corporation associate players